Innocent Graves  is the eighth novel by Canadian detective fiction writer Peter Robinson in the Inspector Banks series of novels. The novel was first printed in 1996, but has been reprinted a number of times since. The novel was selected by Publishers Weekly as one of the best mysteries of the year, nominated for the 1996 Hammett Prize, and won the 1997 Arthur Ellis Award for 'Best Novel'.

Original story
Robinson wrote a short story Innocence in 1990, about Terry Reed who was accused then cleared of the murder of a schoolgirl. Robinson next wrote an entire novel from Reed’s point of view, which was turned down by his publisher. He then thought it might work better with DI Banks, and rewrote the novel as Innocent Graves with DI Banks and Reed as Owen. The short story Innocence was published in  Not Safe After Dark (1998); see Introduction to the collection.

Adaptation
When the story was adapted for television, it was heavily edited and was noted for not bearing much resemblance to the original book. For example, the murder victim was now known as Ellie Clayton; Ellie was last seen leaving her local theatre group, rather than her school; her body was found at a popular beauty spot at Valley's Edge, rather that in the local cemetery; Ellie's father is an internet entrepreneur, rather than an industrialist; and the suspects are her father's business partner, her father, her on-off one-man crime spree boyfriend; and her theatre tutor; rather than a vicar, his wife, or an ex-girlfriend of the accused. The episode was also heavily reminiscent of DC Ken Blackstone's actions, rather than Jimmy Riddle.

Translations 

A German translation by Andree Heese was published by Ullstein in 2004 under the title Der unschuldige Engel.

References

External links
 Dedicated page on author's website

1996 Canadian novels
Novels by Peter Robinson (novelist)
Novels set in Yorkshire
Viking Press books